Otto Nebel (25 December 1892 – 12 September 1973) was a German painter born in Berlin, Germany.

Life
Nebel started his professional career 1909 in the field of building engineering. He took acting classes at the Lessingtheater in Berlin until 1914. His acting teachers were the famous Rudolf Blümner and Friedrich Kayssler. He wanted to give his debut at Stadttheater Haben when World War I broke out. Nebel spent the years of war on the German Eastern and Western Fronts. In 1918, during his 14-month war imprisonment in Colsterdale, England, he wrote his expressionistic poem Zuginsfeld condemning the war. In 1919, he returned to Berlin and became friends with Wassily Kandinsky, Paul Klee, Georg Muche, Kurt Schwitters, and their art. He joined the circle around Herwarth Walden and his wife Nell Walden. She initiated his collaboration at the Sturm gallery and the art school Der Sturm. Together with Hilla von Rebay und Rudolf Bauer he founded the artist group Der Krater in 1923. During this time he also worked for the magazine Der Sturm. Nebel married Hildegard Heitmeyer, the assistant of Gertrud Grunow, in 1924. He met Hildegard at the Bauhaus in Weimar. They stayed in Weimar until 1925 where they painted, wrote poems and acted. In 1933, when the National Socialists disparaged his work as degenerate art, he left Germany for Switzerland, first in Muntelier, and later in Bern. Nebel had financial problems because he was not allowed to work in Switzerland. Thanks to the effort of Kandinsky, he could regularly sell some of his paintings to the Solomon R. Guggenheim Foundation between 1936 and 1951. The German Federal Republic awarded Nebel the Order of Merit of the Federal Republic of Germany in 1965.

Early work
The cutthroat reality he experienced during the First World War as young soldier and army reserve lieutenant influenced his wish to pursue an artistic career. Landmarks for making this decision were the commemorative exhibition for Franz Marc and Nebel's acquaintance with Herwarth Walden, whom he met in 1916 in Berlin. Walden provided an important platform for avant-garde approaches in art, literature, and music with both his Der Sturm gallery and the journal with the same name, and thereby greatly facilitated the breakthrough of expression.

Nebel's distressing experiences during the war is the central theme in his literary debut "Zuginsfeld" (1920). The 6,000-verse poem picks up the thread of August Stramm's poetry and the ensuing Der Sturm school while, however, exploring new paths. The literary collage depicts the mayhem of war by adopting its typical language. Associatively and playing with words, Nebel produced never-ending word chains using authentic word snippets from military orders, passwords and watchwords, headlines, folk songs, and from the language of the educated in Wilhelmine Germany. The satiric bite of the textual collage is visually manifest in the series of drawings for "Zuginsfeld", which he first executed in 1930. With barbed pen Nebel made caricatures in 50 pen-and-ink drawings of the military and other groups in society who, in his eyes, stirred up elation for the war. The grotesque figures are strongly reminiscent of the imagery used by Georg Grosz and Otto Dix.

War likewise impacted Nebel's work in that almost all of his pictorial oeuvre created prior to 1933 was destroyed in Berlin during the Second World War. Therefore, we know little of his early paintings, drawing, and prints. Nebel was in touch with well-known artists and writers during the disoriented post-war era of inflation. He lived in precarious conditions and, among other jobs, took on commissions in order to survive. (See the cover designed for Die Dame magazine of 1920.) He sought refuge in the utopia of art as the contrasting program to his dismal plight. In 1920, Nebel joined forces with Rudolf Bauer and Hilla von Rebay and formed the group Der Krater / Das Hochamt der Kunst ("The crater / The high mass of art"). The three artists shared the view that painting should be purely non-figurative, zeroing in on artistic experience and emotions. The notion that the revolution of modern art could also lead to a wished-for transformation of society linked them to other avant-garde groups of artists and writers. Even if the group did not stay together long, the ideas it pursued remained fundamental for Nebel's work.

Runic fugues and runic flags
Nebel executed them for his poem "Unfeig" (1924/1925), which is a pivotal work for his notions about the alphabet. He called the poem a runic fugue. In "Unfeig", as in his other runic fugue "Das Rad der Titanen" (1926/1957), he used only nine or twelve letters of the alphabet.

The Runen-Fahnen ("Runic Flags") are optical scores that visualize the interplay between individual letters of the alphabet and their various facets. Analogous to the fugue in music, in the runic fugues the vowels and the consonants chosen at the beginning determine the "theme", which is continually repeated and transformed by expansion, reduction, and inversion. Nebel's goal in reduction and concentration of linguistic material was to create a contrasting language to hackneyed everyday language and its rational use. He wrote, "The miseducated people of our times are deaf to words and blind to images. They do not hear what they read. What they write, they cannot see." Nebel believed that he regained the directness lying hidden behind the conventions of language in individual words and letters of the alphabet. With format larger than man-size, the Runen-Fahnen intimate that the whole body should participate in reading.

The Runen-Fahnen are a fourfold visual representation of the original beginning of the text:

Runic Flag 1 displays the wording in a typography invented by Nebel. Runic Flags 2–4, in turn, replace Latin characters with another system of signs and thereby break with habitual perception. The individual letters of the alphabet can no longer be overlooked. Runic Flag 2 records sounds by allocating each one a special form and color affiliated to its specific qualities. Runic Flag 3 takes on the level of characters, which we become aware of as graphic unities and forms by means of alienation. Runic Flag 4 combines both aforementioned aspects. Nebel understood characters or runes as independent linguistic entities whose sound or acoustic and visual dimensions were the key part of an artwork. The runic fugues, however, represent an experimental search for the "inner sound" (Kandinsky) of words and letters, their impact on the emotions. Although the fragments of Uns, unser, Er sie Es (1922) are to be read as preliminary attempts that culminated in the runic fugues, they nevertheless have a very independent and distinct quality. In the original single sheets that were bound together to make the book, Nebel drafted an ABC using painted geometric symbols. On these folios he attempted, at least partly, to find a correspondence between characters and sounds. The artist reworded them later into collages of paper cuttings, making extremely short poems. These works underscore the parity between word and image in his work, between literary and visual forms of expression. His legacy of manuscripts gives insight into the writing process behind the runic fugues and gives a palpable impression of how content is dependent on language.

"Musical" works
Even before Nebel "officially" gave up using representational visual language he created a number of non-objective works, which often had titles taken from music terminology: Animato, Dopio movimento, 'ondo con brio gai or Con Tenerezza. They were produced during the 1930s, some during his sojourns in Italy. Nebel compared his endeavors with those of an orchestra conductor who "rehearses" a score with an orchestra. These works herald his non-objective work.

This is very much what Wassily Kandinsky had in mind in his trailblazing book Concerning the Spiritual in Art: "Musical sound acts directly on the soul and finds an echo there because, though to varying extents, music is innate in man." With increasing tendencies to abstraction, Kandinsky too referred to music and sought to express emotions - analogous to writing scores - with colors and forms in his Compositions, Improvisations, and Impressions.

Nebel untiringly demanded of spectators that they open themselves up to the "resonating tons" of the pictures they view. Nebel asserted, "My painting is poetry, the sister of my linguistic art. Where language ends is where the runic order of symbols begins."

Bavaria and Ascona
Around 1926 to 1928 Nebel was often in the Bavarian village of Kochel, not far from Murnau. He loved to regularly visit Ascona in Switzerland as well. In Kochel he founded a wallpaper factory and met with much adversity and red tape, forcing him very soon to give up the experiment. He produced numerous wallpaper designs at the time, and was able to utilize them repeatedly for his collages at later dates. During his stay in Kochel he often went on hikes in search of motifs in the Bavarian countryside. The artist commented on his colorful drawings from this period in the following words: "The strangeness of the composition is to be understood humorously. The images are such that belong in children's souls. They may be kept protected under galls on small round tables that can be revolved at will. Then mums can take their darlings for a walk around the countryside of Kochel and tell fairytales. They only have to read the story that Uncle Painter has laid down there." Thus are the instructions that Nebel gave to "read" his "colorful and bright compositions" of this period.

Later in the 1920s he returned periodically to Ascona. There he painted intensely colorful scenes with a southern flair (such as Aus Losone ("From Losone") or Ascona-Lido. The town in the Ticino region had a strongly Italian flair and was a key attraction for many avant-garde artists. Among those he met there was, and they planned to start a painting school together (Cavallo rosso). He was additionally invited to exhibit in Ascona together with the artist's group Der grosse Bär. The group comprised artists such as Marianne von Werefkin and the founder of the group, Walter Helbling.

Italy / Arcadia

Italy was an eternal magnet for Nebel. During a three-month stay in 1931, he compiled his Farben-Atlas von Italien ("Italian color atlas"). It was to be the essential basis for many future pictorial compositions. In his explanations on the pages opposite the individual plates, the artist added remarks on the overall ambience of the respective views. The greater the variety of color and the more conspicuous the "resonance", the more generously he calculated the geometrical figures and the colored rectangles. He also "portrayed" the objects by their color-values and "sounds" - whether it was paint on house walls or fishing boats, whether olive or pine groves, mountain ranges or beaches. Ultimately, Nebel compiled a "psycho-historical" catalogue by classifying certain colors according to personal optical impressions, and with the resulting scales he laid the basis for his future work.

How important the color atlas would be for the artist from now on when he was designing or composing pictures can be not only seen in works such as Rivoli, Pompejanisches ("Pompeian"), Camogli, Recco or Arkadisches ("Arcadian"), but already in the sheets Siena I to III. As a former construction expert, he was often greatly taken by architectural aspects. In Siena the earthen colors of the brick buildings dominate. They are interwoven by rhythmic accents - of light and shade, rust-red and olive-green. On the other hand, all sorts of variations blue and gray dominate in the works in which he took the atlas plates of Florence to hand (Toscanische Stadt/Tuscan City, 1932), the city in which the artist repeatedly took refuge in the future. The works that are related to Florence are especially full of allusions to architectural motifs and colorful flashes, and infused with the city's characteristic bright light. After going into exile, Nebel interpreted both building motifs and landscapes through the lens of the Farben-Atlas ("Color Atlas").

Abstraction and the non-objective

The artistic freedom he experienced after leaving Germany in 1933 allowed him to increasingly turn away from representational painting. The gallerist Jeanne Bucher played a role in this transformation in his art. Nebel met her in April 1937 in Paris. She had several artists representing the "new art" in her program, and among them was Wassily Kandinsky. Thus Nebel had contact to the cosmopolitan group Abstraction-Création (Incidents in Light Yellow, Suspended, Happy, all 1937). In 1938, Nebel first officially used the term "non-objective" in his work catalogue, and among such pieces classified in this way is work number "U2", Animato. As early as 1936 onwards, he was able to sell works to the newly founded "Museum of Non-Objective Painting" in New York, that is, to the institution that is now the Guggenheim Museum. Nebel's connections to this museum were of fundamental importance to him, because from 1933 – in exile in Bern – he was without a work permit. He had especially Kandinsky's recommendation to thank for the Guggenheim's support, as well as the goodwill of his friend from his first years in Berlin, Hilla von Rebay, who was the initiator and administrator of the Guggenheim Foundation. This generous and continuous support continued during the Second World War and lasted until 1951. Today, 36 works of art by Nebel dating from 1936 to 1948 still belong to the Guggenheim Museum collection in New York. Others have been sold in the meantime.

That Nebel, after the mid-1930s, explored abstract painting more intensively is linked to a present he received from his wife Hilda at Christmas in 1935: an edition of the I Ching: Book of Changes.

The Near East Series

The whole work comprises sixty large-format sheets. In 1962, Nebel travelled by boat to the Near East via Dubrovnik and Mykonos to Istanbul, Sochi, and Bursa. The drawings optically resemble Arabic or Cyrillic characters and, to a great extent, are executed on gray or black "imperial-quality paper". Nebel considered them to be visual runic narratives that were closely related to his literary texts.

Early portfolio artworks and series
In 1929 he executed four portfolio artworks. They were conceived as a crossover between text and image, whereby the image was mostly created first, and the text subsequently captured thoughts and observations on the respective work. The initial outlines in pen or pencil are partially visible under the colored pencil drawing.

It is only the first series Karneval (Carnival) that has no text; presumably in this case Nebel did not deem a corresponding text necessary. A masked ball that took place in Berlin on 9 February 1929, was the inspiration for the carnival atmosphere Nebel presents in a kaleidoscope of imagery and movement. In total, the artist opens up 26 windows for spectators, through which they can view brightly colored figures and clowns wearing masks as they drift past. Some of them have an eerie appearance.

Artist's relationships
While on leave from the war in Berlin, Nebel visited the commemorative exhibition at Der Sturm Gallery for Franz Marc, who was killed in the war on 4 March 1916. Thus this pivotal artist came to his notice and was henceforth much admired. In Herwarth Walden he met a patron of the arts who later opened up options for exhibitions and publishing. Walden's wife at the time, the Swedish artist Nell Roslund-Walden, ran into Nebel again decades later in Bern, and an old friendship was renewed.

In 1922 Moholy-Nagy exhibited for the first time in Der Sturm Gallery. The two artists met again in 1928 in Ascona, where especially Marianne von Werefkin had become close friends with Nebel. Later Nebel corresponded in particular with Lothar Schreyer and Georg Muche. They had become acquainted at Der Sturm Gallery, and all three sought to restore the missing metaphysical dimensions of art. Nebel felt rapport with Albert Gleizes too. In 1935, he received a letter from him in which Gleizes confirmed their artistic affinity: "Nous sommes sur les memes voies, occupies des memes recherches."

In the heyday of Der Sturm, Wassily Kandinsky was seen as someone who revitalized art and was a guiding star for many artists. A large segment of Nebel's work found its way into the Guggenheim Collection in New York through Kandinsky's and Hilla von Rebay's support. Kandinsky and Nebel exchanged a wealth of letters and thereby left ample proof of their friendship.

Technical diversity
The artist liked to experiment especially with the linocut, a great favorite among the German Expressionists and a medium that they imbued with new life. After contributing to Der Sturm journal in the early 1920s he began to work with this printing technique again, in particular in 1936, and produced the 7-series Gastgeschenk in Schwarz-Weiss ("Hospitality gift in black-and-white"), a self-contained series of 210 linocuts - some of them almost miniatures - presenting a fusion of his hitherto art and form vocabulary. The subject matter of his linocuts follows the repertoire of his colored works on paper and sketches as well as paintings, and occasionally they explore paths for developing entirely new genres. Nebel produced linocuts continually alongside his other work. The medium opened up new and diverse avenues of expression. Again and again he returned to this technique and experimented with different kinds of linoleum and various layers of colors. In this way he achieved a multilayer print very similar to the effect he strived for in his other pictures, that is, to achieve an airy spatial effect. He included cuttings from his linocuts in his papiers collés and collages. In them he also utilized his Kochel wallpapers. Nebel also regularly experimented with "reverse glass painting". This form of art he discovered during a stay in Upper Bavaria, where it was very popular for devotional and votive pictures. Late in life he started to explore this technique again and produced spirited and colorful abstract compositions on glass panels.

Summary

A reminiscence and summary by Kate T. Steinitz of Artforum Los Angeles:

Sound recordings
 "Zuginsfeld. Expressionistische Dichtung zur Ächtung des Krieges, gesprochen von Otto Nebel, aufgenommen in Bern 1972 (rec. Bern 300772)
 "Expressionistische Dichter des Sturms - Otto Nebel spricht: August Stramm, Kurt Schwitters, Otto Nebel; rec. Wien 1962; Amadeo AVRS 2060. Listen to it on: www.ottonebel.org

Literature
 Otto Nebel, Maler und Dichter «Zur Unzeit gegeigt...», herausgegeben von Therese Bhattacharya-Stettler, Steffan Biffiger, Bettina Braun, mit Beiträgen von Therese Bhattacharya-Stettler, Steffan Biffiger, Bettina Braun, Götz-Lothar Darsow, Dolores Denaro, Andreas Mauz, Anna M. Schafroth und Anja Schlegel, Kunstmuseum Bern, Otto Nebel-Stiftung, Bern, Kerber Verlag, Bielefeld 2012, 360 pages, German
 Bhattacharya-Stettler, Therese: Otto Nebel. - Bern: Benteli, 1982. - 
 Liebmann, Kurt: Der Malerdichter Otto Nebel : ein Beitrag zur Philosophie der modernen Kunst. - Zürich: Orell Füssli, 1935
 Otto-Nebel-Stiftung: Otto Nebel. - Bern, 1990
 Therese Bhattacharya-Stettler: "Otto Nebel" In:. Andreas Kotte (ed.) Theatre Dictionary of Switzerland. band 2 Chronos, Zürich 2005, S. 1311 f. Chronos, Zurich 2005, pp. 1311 f
 Karl Epstein: L'Art poétique, ou l'influence de l'esprit de Klee, avec Bissière Didonet Klee Nebel Reichel Steffens Wols. Charles Epstein: L'Art poétique, ou l'influence de l'esprit de Klee, avec Bissière Didonet Clover Mist Reichel Steffens wolf. Poetic Art Edition, Clarens 1995, S. 12, S. 95–117 Poetic Art Edition, Clarens 1995, pp. 12, 95–117
 Kurt Liebmann: The painter poet Otto Nebel: a contribution to the philosophy of modern art. Orell Füssli, Zürich 1935 Orell Füssli, Zurich 1935
 Otto Nebel, Ekkehard Eickhoff: Storm and completion. Ein Lebensbild von Otto Nebel . A Biography of Otto Nebel. As a Festschrift for his 80th Geburtstag. Zürich 1972 Arcade Press, Zurich 1972
 Otto-Nebel-Stiftung (Hrsg.): Otto Nebel. Otto Nebel. Bern in 1990

References

External links
 Otto Nebel website
 
 
 

1892 births
1973 deaths
20th-century German painters
20th-century German male artists
German male painters
Expressionist poets
Abstract painters
Abstract expressionist artists
Artists from Berlin
Avant-garde art
Bauhaus
20th-century poets
Commanders Crosses of the Order of Merit of the Federal Republic of Germany